Repton is a civil parish in the South Derbyshire district of Derbyshire, England.  The parish contains 53 listed buildings that are recorded in the National Heritage List for England. Of these, six are listed at Grade I, the highest of the three grades, one is at Grade II*, the middle grade, and the others are at Grade II, the lowest grade.  The parish contains the village of Repton, the smaller village of Milton, and the surrounding area.  The major complex of buildings is associated with Repton School, built on the site of an earlier priory.  Many of these are listed, four of them at Grade I.  The other Grade I listed buildings are St Wystan's Church and the market cross.  Most of the other listed buildings are houses, cottages and associated structures, the earlier ones timber framed, and the later ones in red brick.  The rest of the listed buildings include farmhouses and farm buildings, bridges, a water management system, a war memorial, and a telephone, kiosk.


Key

Buildings

References

Citations

Sources

 

Lists of listed buildings in Derbyshire